The 1926 Campeonato de Portugal Final was the final match of the 1925–26 Campeonato de Portugal, the 5th season of the Campeonato de Portugal, the Portuguese football knockout tournament, organized by the Portuguese Football Federation (FPF). The match was played on 6 June 1926 at the Campo do Ameal in Porto, and opposed Belenenses and Marítimo. Marítimo defeated Belenenses 2–0 to claim their first Campeonato de Portugal.

Match

Details

References

1926
1925–26 in Portuguese football
C.F. Os Belenenses matches
C.S. Marítimo matches